"Pose" is a single by American rapper Yo Gotti featuring American rapper Lil Uzi Vert. It was released through Epic Records on August 23, 2019.

Background and composition
The release of "Pose" was confirmed in an Epic Records press release. Yo Gotti announced the song via Instagram hours before its release, along with a snippet and artwork.

"Pose" has heavy bass, with Gotti rapping about first-world problems which he faces because of his success and wealth. The song makes use of the sound of a camera shutter. Gotti describes a love-hate relationship through the lyrics, making use of metaphors about posing for pictures.

Remix 
The remix of the single was released October, 2019 featuring Megan Thee Stallion. The remix is added to Yo Gotti's ''Untrapped'' studio album as a bonus track.

Music video 
The music video premiered January, 2020 on Yo Gotti's Vevo account.

Critical reception
David Renshaw of The Fader described "Pose" as a "snap-happy" track, adding that Vert was in a "more confident place" than Gotti. HipHopDXs Chris Patrick called the song a "high caliber single", and stated that it "proves Gotti isn't playing around this year and could be the closest we get to hearing Uzi's Eternal Atake for a while.

Charts

Release history

References

2019 singles
2019 songs
Epic Records singles
Yo Gotti songs
Lil Uzi Vert songs
Songs written by Ben Billions
Songs written by Yo Gotti
Songs written by Lil Uzi Vert